FMK may refer to:

FMK Firearms, an American manufacturer of firearms founded in 2006
Fuck, Marry, Kill, a forced choice question-and-answer game